Spisula sachalinensis (Japanese: ,  or , ;), the Sakhalin surf clam, is a species of edible saltwater clam in the family Mactridae, the surf clams or trough clams. It is commonly referred to as surf clam or Arctic surf clam, though the latter can also refer to Mactromeris polynyma.

The species is commercially exploited and widely used for sushi in Japan. The species is found in Tomakomai, Hokkaido, and numerous other areas.

References

External links
 More information on the species

Mactridae
Molluscs described in 1862
Molluscs of Japan